The 2012 women's road cycling season was the eighth (and last) year for AA Drink–leontien.nl (UCI code: LNL), which began as Van Bemmelen–AA Drink in 2005.

Roster

The 2012 women's road racing team included six riders who were formerly members of the disbanded Garmin–Cervélo women's team: British cyclists Emma Pooley, Lizzie Armitstead, Sharon Laws and Lucy Martin, Belgian Jessie Daams and Australian Carla Ryan.

Ages as of 1 January 2012.

Season victories

 Ladies Tour of Qatar Stages 1 & 3, Kirsten Wild
 Omloop van het Hageland – Tielt-Winge, Lizzie Armitstead
 Gent – Wevelgem WE, Lizzie Armitstead
 Stage 4a Energiewacht Tour, Kirsten Wild
 Tour of Chongming Island World Cup, Shelley Olds-Evans
 Durango-Durango Emakumeen Saria, Emma Pooley
 Overall Rabobank Ster Zeeuwsche Eilanden, Kirsten Wild
 Stage 3, Kirsten Wild
 Stage 6 Giro d'Italia Femminile, Shelley Olds-Evans
 Stage 2 Tour de Feminin – Krasna Lipa, Kirsten Wild
 Stage 3 Tour de Feminin – Krasna Lipa, Lucinda Brand
 Stage 3 Tour Féminin en Limousin, Lucinda Brand
 Stage 6 International Thüringen Rundfahrt der Frauen, Jessie Daams
 Stage 2  Route de France Féminine, Lucinda Brand
 Stages 1 & 2 Lotto–Decca Tour, Kirsten Wild
 Overall Tour Cycliste Féminin International Ardèche, Emma Pooley
 Stages 3 & 5, Emma Pooley
 Stage 6, Carla Ryan
 Stage 3 BrainWash Ladies Tour, Kirsten Wild

Results in major races

Single day races

Grand Tours

Other achievements

Dutch national record, team pursuit

Kirsten Wild, as part of the national team, broke together with Ellen van Dijk and Vera Koedooder the Dutch team pursuit record at the 2012 Summer Olympics.

UCI World Ranking

The team finished 4th in the UCI ranking for teams.

References

2012 UCI Women's Teams seasons
2012 in Dutch sport
2012 in women's road cycling
AA Drink–leontien.nl